Kaduvaye Pidicha Kiduva is a 1977 Indian Malayalam film, directed by A. B. Raj and produced by T. E. Vasudevan. It stars Prem Nazir, Sukumari, Adoor Bhasi and Lakshmi in the lead roles. The musical score was by V. Dakshinamoorthy.

Cast

Prem Nazir
Sukumari
Adoor Bhasi
Lakshmi
Sam
Sankaradi
Sreemoolanagaram Vijayan
G. K. Pillai
Jayamalini
K. P. Ummer
P. K. Abraham
Paravoor Bharathan
Veeran
Vijayalalitha

Soundtrack
The music was composed by V. Dakshinamoorthy and the lyrics were written by Sreekumaran Thampi.

References

External links
 

1977 films
1970s Malayalam-language films